Mongiardino may refer to:

 Lorenzo Mongiardino, Italian architect, interior designer and production designer
 Mongiardino Ligure, comune in the Province of Alessandria in the Italian region Piedmont